"Wish I Knew You" is a song by American rock band the Revivalists. The song was written by the band and was produced by Ben Ellman. The song peaked at number 1 on the Billboard Adult Alternative Songs chart, becoming the band's first chart-topper on the chart. The song also found success on a number of other rock radio formats, as well as adult contemporary stations.  This song had also set a record in May 2017 (since beaten by Portugal. The Man's track "Live In The Moment") for the most plays (spins) ever recorded during a week's time (3,488 across the panel) for any track on Alternative/Modern Rock radio since the inception of Mediabase tracking systems in 1988.

Music video
The music video was released on February 24, 2016.

Use in other media
The song was featured in a 2017 commercial for Blue Moon.

Charts

Weekly charts

Year-end charts

Certifications

Release history

See also
 List of Billboard number-one adult alternative singles of the 2010s

References

2015 songs
2016 singles
Razor & Tie singles
Wind-up Records singles
Concord Music Group singles